Lophonotacarus is a monotypic genus of mites belonging to the monotypic family Lophonotacaridae. The only species is Lophonotacarus minutus.

References 

Sarcoptiformes
Monotypic arachnid genera
Acari genera